Teresina Bodkin is a Montserrat teacher and civil servant who became the first woman Speaker of the Legislative Council of Montserrat.

Bodkin was born on Montserrat and she worked as a secondary school maths teacher who went on to be Montserrat's Director of Statistics, She held that role for 15 years.

On 6 April 2010, Bodkin was selected as the first female Speaker of the island's Legislative Council. Bodkin was supported in this new role by six months of training by former speaker Sir Howard Fergus. During that time Fergus returned to his former role replacing the previous speaker, Joseph Meade. Bodkin served until September 2014. On 17 December 2019, she was reelected to the position of the speaker.

See also
List of speakers of the Legislative Council of Montserrat

References

Living people
Speakers of the Legislative Assembly of Montserrat
Members of the Legislative Council of Montserrat
Montserratian women in politics
Date of birth missing (living people)
21st-century British women politicians
Year of birth missing (living people)
Women legislative speakers